is a Japanese actor who is a member of the Johnny's Jr. unit Four-Yū. He is represented with Johnny & Associates.

Biography
In 1998, Tatsumi entered Johnny & Associates when he was in elementary school 6th grade. He and Yusuke Matsuzaki participated in the same audition. In 1999, Tatsumi performed his stage debut as the young Koichi in the Koichi Domoto-starring stage Show Geki '99 Mask. He acted as a member of the Johnny's Jr. internal unit M.A.D. As a member of Four-Yū from April 2011, Tatsumi mainly works on the stage.

Filmography

Stage

TV dramas

References

Japanese male actors
Johnny & Associates
Singers from Tokyo
1986 births
Living people